The Davidson-Duryea gun carriage was a 3- and 4-wheeled armed armored vehicle manufactured in 1898 and 1899 for military use.

Development history 
Royal Page Davidson of the Northwestern Military Academy in Highland Park, Illinois, was doing some experimenting about this time with automobile chassis, modifying them and adding machine guns with armored shielding for protection of the driver. Davidson was the leading pioneer of armored military vehicles in the United States.

Davidson designed the military gun carriage vehicle and ordered it to be built from the Peoria Rubber and Manufacturing Company. He used patents of Charles Duryea, a well-known automobile manufacturer of the time. Charles Duryea, with his automobile manufacturing company, put it into an automobile-style patent which he filed for on May 16, 1898. It was finally approved as Patent No. 653,224 on July 10, 1900. The military gun carriage gasoline-driven vehicle was built on a Duryea Automobile Company standard production automobile chassis that was converted for military purposes. The first ones cost $1,500.

Previously, in 1896 or 1897, Davidson made an attempt at a three-wheeled gasoline vehicle for military purposes. His experimentation on this vehicle was at the Northwestern Military Academy in Highland Park, Illinois. He made a demonstration of his vehicle to the Army; however, it soon broke down when it left Chicago to go to New York. The Army interpreted this as too severe a task for such a vehicle and that the technology at the time was not up to such a task. The Army from then on leaned away from gasoline-driven vehicles.

In the gun carriage patent, Duryea says the lighter form motor vehicle is a tricycle capable of seating two people. He further says the object of the invention was "to provide a cheap, simple, and effective steering, a compact and durable speed-varying mechanism, a more ready control, an improved brake, a light air-jacketed engine, a cheap and simple balance-gear, and such other minor objects as may appear in the specification".

Davidson arranged for a Colt .30 caliber automatic machine gun to be mounted on the vehicle intended for military use. The vehicle was the first of a series of military vehicles constructed by Royal Page Davidson for the use by the Northwestern Military and Naval Academy. The first vehicles had three wheels (tricycle) and only a gun shield for protection for the driver, while the later vehicles Davidson designed were fully protected by armor.

Since it was originally of a tricycle configuration, the three pneumatic wheels came with wooden spokes and were 36 inches in diameter. The one wheel in the front was used for steering. Later the partially armored vehicle was made with 4 single-spoked wheels, and a driving wheel was installed. The wheels did not come with mudguards. The vehicle had the capacity of four people to ride on top of the rear engine compartment, one driver and three passengers. The front-seat driver and passenger faced forward, while the other two passengers were back-to-back on the rear seat and facing the opposite direction. The vehicle could go 200 miles on a tank of gas and held tents, blankets, equipment and ration supplies for a week or so.

With the addition of the 4,000-round machine gun mounted on the vehicle, one Northwestern cadet wrote "With this gun you could sneak upon an enemy and fire 480 shots a minute and get away before they would know what happened." Davidson made this military armed vehicle in 1899 at the Northwestern Military Academy campus in Highland Park, Illinois. A drawing of the semi-protected military armored vehicle appeared in an 1899 Peoria newspaper. In the "Minor Section" section of the magazine The Horseless Age they said "The Peoria Rubber & Manufacturing Company of Peoria is pushing the motor gun carriage which they are making for Major Davidson in the hope that the Major may reach New York with it in time for the Dewey celebration." The newspapers of the day reported that the United States was first to use motorized guns.

In 1900 the gun carriage vehicle was modified into a sturdier four-wheeler which eventually became the Davidson Automobile Battery armored car, a lightly armored military vehicle. Davidson, inventor of the first military vehicle in the United States, received little credit from the army for his efforts of being the first to build armored cars in the United States.

Footnotes

Sources 

 American men of mark (1917), A Thousand American Men of Mark Today
 Clemens, Al J., The American Military Armored Car,  A.J. Clemens, 1969
 Delta Upsilon fraternity (1902), The Delta Upsilon Decennial Catalogue [1903]
 Hunnicutt, R.P., Armored Car: A History of American Wheeled Combat Vehicle, Presidio Press (2002), 
 Kane, Joseph Nathan, Famous First Facts - A Record of First Happenings, Discoveries and Inventions in the United States, The H. W. Wilson Company (1950)
 Marquis-Who's Who (1950), Who was who in America. 1943-1950, New Providence, New Jersey
 Marquis-Who's Who (1967), Who was who in America: A Companion Biographical Reference Work to Who's who in America
 Quaife, Milo Milton, Wisconsin: Its History and Its People 1634-1924, Volume 4, S.J. Clarke Publishing Company (1924)
 Randall, Frank Alfred, Randall and Allied Families, Raveret-Weber printing company (1943)
 St. John's Military Academy, A History of Excellence: St. John's Northwestern Military Academy, Delafield, Wis., self-published (2002)
 Stern, Philip Van Doren, A Pictorial History of the Automobile, Viking Press (1953)
 Tucker, Spencer, World War I: Encyclopedia, ABC-CLIO, 2005,

External links 
 Armored car Chronology
 Charles Duryea gun carriage patent
 Davidson Auto Battery Armored Car with image
 Duryea automobiles with Davidson-Duryea gun carriages

Duryea
Armoured fighting vehicles before World War I
Armoured cars of the United States